Eric W. Bond (born April 13, 1953) is an American economist. He specializes in international economics and economic theory. Bond is a professor of economics at Vanderbilt University since 2003.

After graduating from Lehigh University in 1974, Bond earned his Master's and Ph.D. from the University of Rochester.

References

External links 
 Website at Vanderbilt University

1953 births
Living people
21st-century American economists
University of Rochester alumni
Vanderbilt University faculty